Jyothi is a 1976 Telugu-language film directed by K. Raghavendra Rao. It is based on the story of an innocent girl "Jyothi." Jayasudha won the Filmfare Award for Best Actress – Telugu for her titular performance.  She later credited the film's success for making her a famous actress in Telugu films.  It is inspired by the Hindi film Mili (1975). though the storyline is completely different from the original except for the heroine suffering from a deadly disease.

Plot
Jyothi (Jayasudha), a teenage girl who is in love with Ravi (Murali Mohan), suddenly marries Rajayya (Gummadi), an old man who is about her father's age. Everyone thinks she married him for the old man's property that she inherits after the marriage, but truth is different. The secret behind this unexpected marriage forms the rest of the gripping family story.

Cast
Murali Mohan as Ravi
Jayasudha as Jyothi
Gummadi as Rajayya
Chaya Devi
Giribabu
Rao Gopala Rao
J.V. Somayajulu
Krishna Kumari
Kaikala Satyanarayana
Shubha
Chidatala Appa Rao
Jayalakshmi

Soundtrack

Awards
Filmfare Awards South
 Filmfare Award for Best Actress – Telugu - Jayasudha
 Filmfare Special Award for Excellent Performance - Gummadi

References

External links

1976 films
Films scored by K. Chakravarthy
Films directed by K. Raghavendra Rao
1970s Telugu-language films
Telugu remakes of Hindi films